American Empire may refer to:

 American Empire (film), a 1942 Western
 American Empire (series), a series of novels by Harry Turtledove
 American Empire Project, a nonfiction book series
 American Empire style, a style of furniture and decoration
 American Empire, a fictional country in the Ghost in the Shell series

See also
 
 Aerican Empire, a micronation name derived from American Empire
 American imperialism